Luann, or Luanne, usually a feminine name combining the more common Louise and Anne, may refer to:

Luann (comic strip), a comic strip by Greg Evans centering on teenager Luann DeGroot
Luanne Platter, a character from King of the Hill TV show
Luann Van Houten, a character from The Simpsons TV show
The "Lu Ann Platter", a budget combination platter from the Luby's Texas cafeteria chain

See also
Lauan (disambiguation), a variant spelling